Alexander Luttrell (20 October 1663 – 22 September 1711) was an English army officer and politician.

He was the third son of Francis Luttrell (1628–1666) of Dunster Castle. His mother Lucy was a daughter of Thomas Symonds of Whittlesford, Cambridgeshire. Colonel Francis Luttrell (1659–1690) was his older brother.
He inherited the heavily indebted Dunster Castle after the death of both his elder brothers and then his brother Francis's son in 1703.

He sat in the House of Commons of England from 1690 to 1707 as a Member of Parliament (MP) for Minehead, and then held the seat for a further year in the House of Commons of Great Britain.

He married, in 1702, Dorothy, the daughter of Edward Yard of Churston Ferrers, Devon and had two sons and a daughter.

See also 
 Feudal barony of Dunster

References 
 

1663 births
1711 deaths
Alexander
English MPs 1690–1695
English MPs 1695–1698
English MPs 1698–1700
English MPs 1701
English MPs 1702–1705
English MPs 1705–1707
Members of the Parliament of Great Britain for English constituencies
British MPs 1707–1708